Asylum is the thirteenth studio album by the American rock band Kiss, released on September 16, 1985. The album marked a continuation of the glam metal sound of the preceding album Animalize.

Recording
Asylum is the first album to feature lead guitarist Bruce Kulick as an official band member. Kulick had replaced former guitarist Mark St. John on some tracks on the previous album Animalize (1984), during the latter's absence due to reactive arthritis. Subsequently, Kulick filled St. John's spot on most segments of the Animalize tour. This new lineup of Paul Stanley, Gene Simmons, Eric Carr, and Kulick would last until Carr's death in November 1991, while Kulick would stay with the band until the reunion of the original lineup in 1996.

Cover
The album cover depicts the four band members with colored lips, mirroring the colors of the 1978 solo releases: red for Simmons, purple for Stanley, blue for Kulick (replacing Ace Frehley) and green for Carr (replacing Peter Criss). The placement of the band’s faces also mirrors 1979’s Dynasty cover: (clockwise from top left) Stanley, Simmons, Carr (replacing Criss), & Kulick (replacing Frehley).  The artwork for the back cover is similarly stylised and colourful, depicting Kiss against a white background. The cover art of the remastered 1997 CD release of Asylum featured slightly altered, bolder colours than that of the original release.

Singles
"Tears Are Falling" was the only track to be released for retail sales as a single and was a hit for the band, with the video, in particular, proving popular on MTV. A total of three music videos for the album were filmed on set in London, England, for the songs "Who Wants to Be Lonely", "Uh! All Night" and "Tears Are Falling".

Reception
 
The album was certified Gold  in November 1985 by the RIAA.

Track listing
All credits adapted from the original release.

Personnel
Kiss
Paul Stanley – vocals, rhythm guitar; bass guitar on "Tears Are Falling"
Gene Simmons – bass guitar, vocals
Eric Carr – drums, percussion, backing vocals
Bruce Kulick – lead guitar, backing vocals

Additional musicians
Jean Beauvoir – bass guitar and backing vocals on "Who Wants to Be Lonely" and "Uh! All Night"
Allan Schwartzberg – additional drums overdubs

Production
Dave Wittman – engineer, mixing
Ed Garcia, Ken Steiger – assistant engineers
George Marino – mastering at Sterling Sound, New York

Charts

Album

Singles

Certifications

References

External links

Kiss (band) albums
1985 albums
Albums produced by Gene Simmons
Albums produced by Paul Stanley
Mercury Records albums
Vertigo Records albums
Albums recorded at Electric Lady Studios
Albums recorded at MSR Studios